John Knapton may refer to:

 John Knapton (engineer)
 John Knapton (MP)